Chum Saeng Songkhram is a subdistrict in the Bang Rakam District of Phitsanulok Province, Thailand.

Geography
Chum Saeng Songkhram lies in the Yom Basin, which is part of the Chao Phraya Watershed.

Administration
The following is a list of the subdistrict's muban (villages):

Domestic dog breed
Chum Saeng Songkhram is origin of Thai dog breed Thai Bangkaew Dog or just called Bang Kaew, a spitz-type dog.

References

Tambon of Phitsanulok province
Populated places in Phitsanulok province